Manassas, formerly Manassas Junction, is an independent city in the Commonwealth of Virginia, United States. The population was 42,772 at the 2020 Census. It is the county seat of Prince William County, although the two are separate jurisdictions. Manassas borders the independent city of Manassas Park, Virginia. The Bureau of Economic Analysis includes both Manassas and Manassas Park with Prince William County for statistical purposes.

Manassas contains several historic sites dating from 1850 to 1870. Manassas surrounds the  county courthouse, which is located on county property.

Manassas is part of the Washington-Arlington-Alexandria, DC-VA-MD-WV Metropolitan Statistical Area and is in the Northern Virginia region.

History
In July 1861, the First Battle of Bull Run—also known as the Battle of First Manassas —was fought nearby, the first major land battle of the American Civil War. Manassas commemorated its 150th anniversary on July 21–24, 2011.

The Second Battle of Bull Run (or the Battle of Second Manassas) was fought near Manassas on August 28–30, 1862. At that time, Manassas Junction was little more than a railroad crossing, but a strategic one, with rails leading to Richmond, Virginia, Washington, D.C., and the Shenandoah Valley. Despite these two Confederate victories, Manassas Junction was in Union hands for most of the war.

Following the war, the crossroads grew into the town of Manassas, which was incorporated in 1873. In 1894, Manassas was designated the county seat of Prince William County, replacing Brentsville. In 1975, Manassas was incorporated as an independent city, and as per Virginia law, was separated from Prince William County.

Manassas is home to Annaburg, built in 1892 by Robert Portner as a summer home. It is believed to be one of the first homes in the United States to have mechanical air conditioning.  Annaburg was purchased by the City of Manassas in July 2019 to be restored and preserved as a public park.

The Manassas Historic District; Liberia, a plantation house; the Manassas Water Tower; the Cannon Branch Fort; the Mayfield Fortification; the Manassas Industrial School for Colored Youth; and Annaburg are listed on the National Register of Historic Places.

Geography
Manassas is mainly served by I-66, U.S. 29, Virginia State Route 234 Business and Virginia State Route 28.

Climate
The climate in this area is characterized by hot, humid summers and generally mild to cool winters. According to the Köppen Climate Classification system, Manassas has a humid subtropical climate, abbreviated "Cfa" on climate maps. The local hardiness zone is 7a.

Demographics

2020 census

According to the census of 2020, the population of the City of Manassas was 42,772 which represented a 13.1% growth in population since the last census in 2010. The racial breakdown per the 2020 Census for the city is as follows:
 51.1% White (34.6% Non-Hispanic White)
 14.2% Black (11.5% non-Hispanic Black)
 7.8% Asian
3.2% Native American (Including Alaska, Hawaii and Pacific Islands) 
 24% Other

42.9% of the population was of Hispanic or Latino origin. This can be broken up ethnically as follows (2010 numbers):
 9.9% Mexican
 1.1% Puerto Rican
 0.2% Cuban
 20.2% other Hispanic or Latino

The population density for the city is 3,782.1 people per square mile, and there are an estimated 13,103 housing units in the city with an average housing density of 1,310.3 per square mile.  The greatest percentage of housing values of owner-occupied homes (34.8%) is $300,000 to $499,999, with a median owner-occupied housing value of $259,100.  The city's highest period of growth was from 1980 to 1989, when 35% of the city's housing stock was constructed.

The ACS estimated median household income for the city in 2020 was $86,227. 36% of the population has a college degree.  Almost as many people commute into the City of Manassas for work (13,316) as out (13,666), with the majority of out commuters traveling to Fairfax and Prince William counties for their jobs. Unemployment in the city as of February, 2022 was 2.5%, which was below that of the United States at 3.8%. Of the 21,221 working age residents, 20,620 were employed. City residents are primarily employed in Professional, Scientific and Technical Services, and Health Care and Social Assistance.

Economy
The Manassas Regional Airport has 26 businesses operating out of the airport property. There are 415 based airplanes and two fixed-base operators, APP Jet Center and Dulles Aviation. The Manassas Regional Airport has land available for development.

The city's third-largest employer is Micron Technology. Headquartered in Boise, Idaho, this manufacturer of semiconductors operates its wafer factory in Manassas, where it employs 1,650 people directly, and several hundred others through vendor contracts. In December 2018, Micron began a $3 billion-dollar expansion project at the Manassas site, and it's expected to create 1,100 jobs by 2030. Other major employers include Lockheed Martin (1500 employees) and the Novant Prince William Health System (1400 employees). In 2019 High Purity Systems, a locally based high-tech contracting company, announced plans to invest $8.5 million in new facilities to triple production capability, marking the continued expansion of high-tech firms in the area.

11% of people working in Manassas live in the city, while 89% commute in. 36% commute from Prince William County and 18% commute from Fairfax. Additionally 16,700 people commute from Manassas to the surrounding areas. In 2016, 3.3% of Manassas residents were unemployed.

In 2017 the city created new "streetscape standards" and announced plans for the Mathis Avenue Streetscape Project, aimed at developing Mathis Avenue from Sudley Road to Liberia Avenue into a more pedestrian-friendly, walkable area with significantly improved traffic congestion. The plan is estimated to cost the city $7.3 million and to be completed by 2024.

Arts and culture
First Friday festivals occur on the first Friday of every month, when the city showcases local art and organizes themed activities. The city museum opened in 1973 in preparation for the city's centennial and is currently undergoing a renovation and expansion to be completed in Fall 2023.

Parks and recreation 
 Sumner Lake Community Clubhouse & Pool
 Annaburg Historic Site 
 Liberia House Historic Site
 Central Park Aquatic Center
 Cannon Branch Fort
 Baldwin Park
 Vertical Rock Climbing & Fitness Center
 Dean Park

Government

Manassas has a council-manager system of government. As of October 2021 the city manager is William Patrick Pate; the mayor is Michelle Davis-Younger; and the vice mayor is Pamela J. Sebesky.

Education

The City of Manassas is served by the Manassas City Public Schools. There are five elementary schools in Manassas, two intermediate schools, a middle school, and a high school. In 2006, Mayfield Intermediate School opened, serving students in fifth and sixth grade. Due to growth, Baldwin Intermediate School opened in September 2017, also serving 5th and 6th graders.

Some schools in the Prince William County Public Schools district have Manassas addresses, though they are located, and serve areas, outside the Manassas city limits.

Seton School, a private Roman Catholic junior and senior high school affiliated with the Diocese of Arlington, provides Catholic education from its Manassas location. The All Saints Catholic School at the All Saints Parish provides Catholic Education from pre-K through 8th grade. The All Saints Catholic School was a Presidential Blue Ribbon Award winner in 2009.

Also in the vicinity of Manassas are branch campuses of American Public University System, George Mason University, Northern Virginia Community College, ECPI College of Technology and Strayer University. Though some of these are just outside the city limits in Prince William County, NVCC and Strayer call these branches their Manassas Campuses.

Public schools in Manassas:
 Baldwin Elementary School
 Jennie Dean Elementary School
 Richard C. Haydon Elementary School
 George C. Round Elementary School
 Weems Elementary School
 Baldwin Intermediate School
 Mayfield Intermediate School
 Grace E. Metz Middle School
 Osbourn High School

Infrastructure

Transportation

Major highways
The major roads into and out of Manassas are Virginia State Route 28, Virginia State Route 234 and Virginia State Route 234 Business. I-66 and US-29 service Manassas, but neither passes through the city itself.

Airports
Manassas Regional Airport is within the city limits. It is the busiest general aviation airport in Virginia, with more than 415 aircraft and 26 businesses based onsite, including charter companies, avionics, maintenance, flight schools and aircraft services.

Between 2019 and 2021 APP Jet Center, a jet servicing company, built three new hangars fit for larger private planes along with extensive renovations to their existing hangars.

Rail transportation
Manassas began life as Manassas Junction, so named for the railroad junction between the Orange and Alexandria Railroad and the Manassas Gap Railroad. The O&A owned the railway from Alexandria through Manassas to points south, ending in Orange, Virginia, while the MGRR was an independent line constructed from Manassas Junction through the Manassas Gap westward. In addition Manassas was the site of the first large scale military use of railroad transportation.

These original routes are now owned by the Norfolk Southern railroad. Amtrak and the Virginia Railway Express (VRE) provide regular inter-city and commuter service to the city and surrounding area on the tracks owned by NS. Manassas station is served by VRE and three Amtrak routes: the New York City to Chicago Cardinal, Boston to Roanoke Northeast Regional, and New York to New Orleans Crescent.

The train station was also used for the cover photo of Stephen Stills' album Manassas.

Notable people 
 Wilmer McLean (1814-1882), Wholesale grocer, owner of the McLean House
 Jim Bucher (1911–2004), infielder and outfielder in Major League Baseball
 Ryan Burroughs, professional rugby league footballer currently playing for Toronto Wolfpack
 Mason Diaz, NASCAR driver
 Danny Doyle, Irish folk singer
 Wilmer Fields, pitcher and third baseman in Negro league baseball
 Brandon Hogan, football player
Elizabeth Friench Johnson (1890–1979), college professor
 Chaney Kley (1972–2007), American film and television actor
 Jon Knott, Major League Baseball outfielder
 Jeremy Linn, 1996 Summer Olympics swimmer and current swimming coach
 Mike O'Meara, radio personality
 Harry J. Parrish (1922–2006), longtime member of the Virginia House of Delegates
 Leven Powell, also Levin, (1737–1810), U.S. Representative from Virginia
 Jason Richardson, American guitarist
 Kevin Ricks, convicted sex offender
 David Robinson, American basketball player
 Danica Roem, the first ever openly transgender woman to be elected to a US legislature
 Ravi Shankar, American poet
 Joanna Mary Berry Shields, teacher and founder of Alpha Kappa Alpha Sorority, Inc.
 C. J. Sapong, American soccer player currently playing for Sporting Kansas City
 Leeann Tweeden, model
 Lucky Whitehead, former National Football League wide receiver
 Ryan Williams, running back for the Dallas Cowboys
 George Zimmerman, shot and killed Trayvon Martin, a minor, and later acquitted in Florida

In popular culture
 A season 6 episode of the Discovery Channel series A Haunting, called Marked by Evil, takes place in Manassas in 2008-2011.
 Portions of the music video for the Steve Winwood song "Back in the High Life Again" were filmed at the train station in Manassas.
In episode three of Marvel’s “What if…?” Manassas, Virginia is featured as Natasha Romanoff travels to a library.
In crime drama Criminal Minds, BAU profiler Aaron Hotchner (Thomas Gibson) is from Manassas.

See also
 Manassas Police Department
 National Register of Historic Places listings in Manassas, Virginia

Notes

References

 
Manassas
Northern Virginia
Washington metropolitan area
County seats in Virginia
Majority-minority counties and independent cities in Virginia